Tokio Hotel is a German music band, founded in 2001 by singer Bill Kaulitz, guitarist Tom Kaulitz, bassist Georg Listing, and drummer Gustav Schäfer. Starting from the foundation, the band's music genres were pop rock and alternative rock; since 2014, the band began to perform electropop and synth-pop. 

After recording a demo album under the name "Devilish" and having their contract with Sony BMG Germany terminated, the band released their first German-language album, Schrei, as Tokio Hotel on Universal Music Germany in 2005. Schrei sold more than half-a-million copies worldwide and spawned four top-five singles in both Germany and Austria. In 2007, the band released their second German-language album, Zimmer 483, and their first English-language album, Scream, which have combined album sales of over 2.5 million copies worldwide and helped win the band their first MTV Europe Music Award for Best InterAct. The former, Zimmer 483, spawned three top-five singles in Germany while the latter, Scream, spawned two singles that reached the top-twenty in new territories such as France, Portugal, Spain and Italy. 

In September 2008, they won their first MTV Video Music Award, for Best New Artist. Tokio Hotel became the first German band ever to win an award at the MTV VMAs and to also win awards at the MTV Latin America Awards. They also picked up the Headliner award at the MTV Europe Music Awards 2008 and the award for Best Group at the MTV Europe Music Awards 2009. They won for Best World Stage Performance on 7 November 2010 at the MTV Europe Music Awards. In July 2011, they became the first German band to win an award at the MTV Video Music Awards Japan. The band has sold more than 10 million records worldwide.

Their most recent work is the 2022 album called 2001.

History

Formation, early years and debut album (2001–2006)

Twin brothers Bill Kaulitz and Tom Kaulitz along with drummer Gustav Schäfer and bass-guitarist Georg Listing formed the band in 2001 under the name Devilish, and they soon began playing in talent shows and small concerts. After Bill Kaulitz's participation in a children's Star Search in 2003 at age thirteen (which he lost in the quarter-final), he was discovered by music producer Peter Hoffmann. Devilish changed their name to Tokio Hotel: "Tokio", the German spelling of the Japanese city Tokyo, due to a love of the city, and "Hotel" due to their constant touring and living in hotels. Soon after Sony BMG took them under contract, Hoffmann hired David Jost and Pat Benzner into the team of creators and authors, and had them give the teens instruction on songwriting and instrument playing; most of the songs of the first album were written by Hoffmann, Jost and Benzer (including the singles "Scream" and "Rescue me" which were completely written by them), only the single "Unendlichkeit" was written completely by Tokio Hotel themselves. Shortly before release of their first album, Sony terminated their contract.

In 2005 Universal Music Group took Tokio Hotel under contract and developed a marketing plan. Their first single, "Durch den Monsun" ("Through the Monsoon"), quickly rose in the charts, appearing on the German official Media Control single chart at No. 15 on 20 August 2005 and eventually reaching No. 1 on 26 August 2005; it also reached No. 1 on the Austrian singles chart. Their second single, "Schrei" ("Scream"), climbed to the No. 5 position in the German charts. These two songs were written by singer Bill Kaulitz together with their group of producers Peter Hoffmann, David Jost, Pat Benzer and Dave Roth. Their debut album, Schrei, was released on 19 September 2005, and was certified triple gold by the BVMI in 2006 for selling over 300,000 copies in Germany. In 2006, a third and fourth single, "Rette mich" ("Rescue Me") and "Der letzte Tag" ("The Final Day"), were released; both reached No. 1 as well. "Der letzte Tag" contained a B-side called "Wir schließen uns ein", which was also accompanied by a music video.

Zimmer 483 and Scream (2006–2008)
The first single off their second album Zimmer 483 (Room 483), called "Übers Ende der Welt" (later re-released in English under the name "Ready, Set, Go!"), was released on 26 January 2007 and quickly reached No. 1 in Germany and Austria, and No. 2 in France. Zimmer 483 was released in Germany on 23 February 2007, along with a deluxe edition of the album containing a DVD. The album's second single, "Spring nicht" ("Don't Jump") was released on 7 April. The tour accompanying the release of the album, The Zimmer 483 Tour, scheduled to start in March 2007, was delayed by two weeks because the band members wished to have a different stage design. A third single, "An deiner Seite (Ich bin da)" ("By Your Side"), was released on 16 November. The single contains the B-side "1000 Meere" ("1000 Oceans"), for which a music video was also produced.
On 28 April 2008 Tokio Hotel released their single "Heilig" but no music video for the single was released, because of the tight schedule they had.

Tokio Hotel's first English-language album, Scream, was released on 4 June 2007 throughout Europe. In Germany, the album was released as Room 483 in order to emphasize the continuity with their last German album Zimmer 483. Scream contains English versions of a selection of songs from Tokio Hotel's German-language albums Schrei and Zimmer 483. "Monsoon", the English-language version of "Durch den Monsun", was the first single from the album. "Ready, Set, Go!" (the translation of "Übers Ende der Welt") was released as the album's second single and "Don't Jump" (the translation of "Spring nicht") as the third single. A video for "Scream", the English-language version of their 2005 hit "Schrei", was also recorded, and was released to the iTunes Store in early March 2008.

Tokio Hotel gave their first concert in the United Kingdom on 19 June 2007. "Ready, Set, Go!" was released in the UK as the band's first single on 27 August 2007. The song reached No. 77 in the UK Singles Chart.

Tokio Hotel won an MTV Europe Music Award for Best InterAct on 1 November 2007 and were also nominated for Best Band. They performed "Monsoon" at the event.

Tokio Hotel released their first US single, simply called "Tokio Hotel", in late 2007. The single contains the tracks "Scream" and "Ready, Set, Go!", and was available exclusively at Hot Topic stores. Their second US single, "Scream America", was released on 11 December 2007. The single contains the track "Scream" and a remix of "Ready, Set, Go!" by AFI's Jade Puget. In February 2008, the band toured North America for five dates, starting in Canada and finishing up in New York. After Tokio Hotel had appeared and performed live on MuchMusic while touring in Canada, "Ready, Set, Go!" entered the MuchOnDemand Daily 10, a countdown of videos chosen by viewers. It remained there for over a week, then returned to the top of the MOD Daily 10 chart on 8 April. "Scream" was released in Canada on 25 March and in the US on 6 May.

The "1000 Hotels" European Tour began on 3 March 2008 in Brussels and continued through locations including the Netherlands, Luxembourg, France, Spain, Portugal, Italy, Serbia and Scandinavia. It was scheduled to finish on 9 April; during the concert in Marseille, France, on 14 March, Bill started to experience vocal problems. He let the audience sing more frequently than normal, and instead of the original 21 songs on the set list, the band played only 16 songs. Bill apologized, in German, for his bad singing and explained that he was sick. Two days later, the band cancelled the Lisbon, Portugal concert minutes before it was supposed to commence. The rest of the "1000 Hotels" Tour and a scheduled North American Tour were cancelled after the band's manager announced in Bild that Bill Kaulitz had to undergo surgery to remove a cyst on his vocal cords.

Bill Kaulitz had been putting strain on his voice after playing 43 concerts in the 1000 Hotels tour without a break. He had to undergo larynx surgery on 30 March to remove a cyst that had formed on his vocal cords. The cyst resulted from a throat infection that had gone untreated. Following his surgery Bill could not speak for ten days and had four weeks of vocal rehabilitation. If Bill had continued singing the rest of the tour, his voice would have eventually been permanently damaged. Tokio Hotel started performing again in May 2008
and after that they embarked on a second part of their 1000 Hotels European Tour, adding many open-air concerts and wrapping up the tour on 13 July in Werchter in Belgium.

Humanoid, Humanoid City Live, Best Of (2008-2012) 

In August 2008 Tokio Hotel embarked on a second tour of North America, including a performance at the Bamboozled festival in New Jersey. The band's music video for "Ready Set Go!" was nominated for Best Pop Video at the 2008 MTV Video Music Awards, where they won the award for Best New Artist. They returned to North America in October 2008 for a month-long tour of concerts and record-store signings. In December 2008 a behind-the-scenes DVD called Tokio Hotel TV – Caught on Camera was released. It contains footage from Tokio Hotel TV and backstage feature-stories of the previous year on disc one entitled "History – The very best of Tokio Hotel TV!". A deluxe edition contains a second disc entitled "Future – The road to the new Album!" which features footage of the band on promotion tours and preparing for their third studio album.

In between the North American tours, the band returned to their record studio in Hamburg to record their third studio album, Humanoid, which was released on 2 October in Germany and 6 October 2009 in the U.S., despite earlier statements predicting a March/April 2009 release or a May/June 2009 release. The album was recorded in both German and English, with both versions released simultaneously worldwide.

On 10 August, it was announced on MTV News that the first German single would be "Automatisch" and that its English counterpart, "Automatic", would be released as a first single in the United States. On 20 August, MTV Buzzworthy released a video which previewed "Automatic" and Cherrytree Records announced that the English version of the song would be released in the US on 22 September. Nevertheless, the video for the single was released on 3 September.

On 2 November 2009 Tom's blog announced that the second English single would be "World Behind My Wall" and that its German counterpart, "Lass uns laufen", would be the second German single.
The music videos for both versions were released on 14 and 15 December.

The group toured thirty-two cities in Europe from 22 February to 14 April 2010. On 24 June 2010, the live music-video for their single, "Dark Side of the Sun", was released on the band website.

On 20 July 2010, they released their second live album, Humanoid City Live, from Milan, Italy. On 22 November 2010, their new song "Hurricanes and Suns" premiered on the Greek radio-station Mad Radio. It was included in the bonus track on all versions of Tokio Hotel: Best Of, a compilation album of their most successful songs.

On 13 December 2010 their Best of was released in Germany. It was released internationally the next day. 2 December was the World Premiere of the video for "Hurricanes and Suns" on the official Tokio Hotel website.

Tokio Hotel performed their first concert in Asia (excluding their concert in Israel) at the Audi Showcase in Singapore, followed shortly by the TM Connects With Tokio Hotel event in Malaysia, promoting the sales of their album Humanoid. They concluded the series of mini-concerts with Taiwan. They returned to Malaysia a couple of months later to perform at MTV World Stage Live in Malaysia 2010. They performed in Tokyo on 15 December 2010, after their South American tour concluded in Distrito Federal, Mexico on 2 December 2010. In February 2011 Tokio Hotel travelled to Japan to complete a second promo tour. A number of television appearances and media interviews took place between 8 and 11 February.

On 28 April 2011 they received the "Fan Army FTW" award at the MTV O Music Awards, the network's first online award-show. A clip of Bill and Tom thanking their fans played after the winner was announced.

On 24 June 2011 Tokio Hotel performed in Japan at "The Next Premium Night Tokio Hotel in Tokyo". Audi A1 presented the event, and 150 fans were chosen to win tickets to attend the show. The event was the band's first acoustic performance in Japan. On 25 June 2011 the band performed live at the MTV Video Music Aid Japan in Tokyo. The show, formerly called the "Video Music Awards Japan", was used as a music benefit to raise money for the Japanese Red Cross in order to help those affected by the 2011 earthquake.

Not long after finishing the "Welcome to Humanoid City Tour", Bill and Tom, with their manager David Jost, moved to Los Angeles and continue to live there.

On 18 May 2012 Far East Movement released an album named "Dirty Bass", featuring the song "If I Die Tomorrow", which includes vocals by Bill.

Kings of Suburbia and touring (2013–2015)

On 5 January 2013, Tom Kaulitz confirmed on the "BTK Twins" app (which was recalled in November) that a new album would be released in 2013. During MTV's Musical March Madness 2013 Tournament, Tokio Hotel promised to release their new album "if they repeat as March Madness Champs". Although they did not win the award, and despite inactivity, the band managed to gather a considerable amount of support from their fanbase. Once again, Tokio Hotel announced that they were planning to release a new single on 27 October 2013 and the album the following month. However, neither the album nor any new singles were released during that year.

On 22 January 2014, the band's producer, Peter Hoffman, announced that recording for the new album had been completed and that they were in the process of selecting the track list. He stated that there was no release date yet, but the album would come out later in 2014. On 3 April, the band informed their fans via Facebook and Twitter about their recent website update, which included an official video teaser of them working on their upcoming album and never-before-seen photos of the members.

After the comeback of Tokio Hotel TV, the band announced on Twitter that the album had been finished and was currently in the hands of the label. On 3 September 2014 Bill Kaulitz announced via his Instagram account that the name of the new album would be Kings of Suburbia and it would be released on 3 October.

On 12 September, Tokio Hotel released a music video for the song "Run, Run, Run" from their new album. "Girl Got a Gun" was also released as a second promotional song on 19 September, followed by a music video on 23 September. The lead single from the album, Love Who Loves You Back, was released on 26 September, followed by a music video on 30 September.
The album was released in three versions on 3 October 2014 and was number one in 30 countries and in TOP5 in 17 more countries.

Tokio Hotel's new world tour "Feel It All World Tour" started 6 March in Europe with "Part 1: the Club Experience", giving fans an exclusive personal encounter with the band in special club-sized venues. Part 2 will commence with dates in the United States, followed by dates in Latin America (Part 3) and Russia (Part 4). The second official single from the album is the namesake of the tour, "Feel It All". The video for it was released 27 March 2015, and the "Feel It All" EP was released for sale 3 April 2015.

Dream Machine album and tour (2016–2017)

During an interview in May 2016, Bill Kaulitz announced that there would be a new album titled Dream Machine and a new world tour in 2017. In late December 2016 as promotion for the album, the band released the first two songs from the album on YouTube. The first, "Something New", was released on 23 December and the second, "What If", was released on 29 December.

On 2 January 2017, the band announced via their official Facebook page that Dream Machine would be released on 3 March 2017. While they are no longer with Universal Music, they have since signed with Starwatch Music.

On 25 September 2017, Tokio Hotel announced their North America tour dates for 2018, however these dates were later cancelled due to technical issues with the band's equipment.

The third single, "Boy Don't Cry" was released on 20 October 2017 along with its accompanying music video, with also three remixes; "Regi Remix", "Tiefschwarz Remix" and "Drangsal Edit".

The fourth single, "Easy", was released on 22 December 2017 along with its accompanying music video.

Melancholic Paradise, Durch den Monsun 2020 and Monsoon 2020 (2018–2020)

On 29 October 2018, the band announced via their official Facebook page that they will be embarking on a new tour in 2019 named "Melancholic Paradise" wherein they will perform both familiar songs and new ones from their upcoming album. Only Europe dates have been announced at that time. The singles "Melancholic Paradise", "When It Rains It Pours" and "Chateau" were respectively released on 1 February 2019, 5 April 2019, and 17 November 2019.

In October 2019, Bill Kaulitz announced via his Instagram account that the upcoming Tokio Hotel album has been finished with the recording sessions and that it will be released in 2020. Also, the next day, he has announced via his Instagram account that the band has added North America and Latin America legs to their "Melancholic Paradise Tour" for the same year with the release of the band sixth studio album. The band had only completed three venues on their North America and Latin America tour and the rest of the tour was since cancelled at the last minute before their show in Ecuador due to the COVID-19 pandemic and resulting lockdowns worldwide.

All photos, videos and content were removed from Tokio Hotel's official Instagram account early August 2020, and older photos of the band were uploaded instead. This was later revealed to be due to the 15th anniversary of the release of the band's debut single "Durch den Monsun" on 15 August 2005.

During a live chat on Spotify, the band confirmed that new versions of "Durch den Monsun" and "Monsoon" will be released some time in Autumn 2020 as a celebration of the single's 15th anniversary. "Durch den Monsun 2020" and "Monsoon 2020" were respectively released on 2 October 2020 and 16 October 2020. Bill also confirmed that a new German-language song will be released later this year, and that a new tour is planned in 2021 for Europe and other continents. On 1 September 2020, Tokio Hotel revealed to have signed a new record deal with Sony Music Germany and Epic Records Germany throughout their official Instagram account.

Tokio Hotel announced on 4 December 2020 via Instagram their new single "Berlin", featuring a guest appearance from Canadian singer VVAVES, which was released on 11 December 2020.

Beyond the World Tour, collaborations and 2001 (2020–present)
On 7 December 2020, the band announced via their official Facebook page and Instagram account that they will be embarking on a new tour in Autumn 2021 named "Beyond the World", promoting "Durch den Monsun 2020" and "Monsoon 2020", whilst wishing to perform more songs from their upcoming album. Only Europe dates have been announced at that time.

Via their #AskTokioHotel livestream on Twitter, the band have announced a new single called "White Lies", which will feature a guest appearance from German EDM duo VIZE. This was released on 15 January 2021.

On 16 December 2020, the band appeared on MDR Sputnik's talk show Friends of Sputnik, where they were interviewed by host Sissy Metzschke, and later performed the songs; "Durch den Monsun 2020", "Love Who Loves You Back", "Black", "Melancholic Paradise" and "Berlin". On 7 February 2021, the band appeared on Super Bowl LV on ProSieben, on which they performed the songs; "When It Rains It Pours", "Covered in Gold", "We Found Us", "What If", "White Lies" and "Stormy Weather".

On 19 March 2021, the band started a social media contest called the White Lies Cover Challenge, where they asked fans to create their own cover of "White Lies" on video and to submit it by 4 April 2021 on Instagram, Facebook or Twitter using the hashtag #WhiteLiesCoverChallenge. The winning covers would then be used by the band in a fan video version of the song, which was uploaded to their official YouTube account on 15 April 2021.

The band had a new Instagram livestream on 25 March 2021, on which they announced a new song would be released on 28 May 2021. The new song will be a dance cover of "Behind Blue Eyes" by classic rock legend The Who, and like "White Lies", the cover will also feature a guest appearance from VIZE. The band also announced a remix version of "White Lies" with German DJ NOØN, which was released on 2 April 2021. Another remix version of the song with German DJ duo HBz was released on 7 May 2021.

On 14 May 2021 the band have postponed the European leg of their Beyond the World Tour until Spring 2022. This is due to the ongoing COVID-19 pandemic, global lockdowns and restrictions.

Instead of the planned date of 28 May 2021, "Behind Blue Eyes" was released on 27 May 2021 to coincide with the band's live performance of the song on ProSieben's Germany's Next Topmodel on the same day.

On 7 June 2021 the band started a social media contest called the Behind Blue Eyes Cover Challenge, where, like with "White Lies", they asked fans to create their own cover of "Behind Blue Eyes" on video and to submit it on Instagram, Facebook or Twitter using the hashtag #BBE_challenge. The winning covers would then be used by the band in a fan video version of the song.

On 9 August 2021 Bill Kaulitz has revealed on a post on his official Instagram account that a new single will be released on  27 August 2021.

A new single called "Sorry Not Sorry" was released by German rapper Badchieff on 27 August 2021 with Tokio Hotel making a guest appearance.

On 27 August 2021 the band appeared on Spielesause 2021 (the German livestreaming event of Gamescom), where they performed "White Lies", "Behind Blue Eyes" and "Sorry Not Sorry" with Badchieff.

On 4 October 2021 the band announced a new single called "Here Comes the Night" via Instagram. This was released on 22 October 2021 along with an official lyric video on YouTube, which features Bill Kaulitz singing the song with lyrics popping up on the screen.

On 22 October 2021 the band performed in the restaurant China Club Berlin to promote the release of "Here Comes the Night", which was played after "White Lies" and "Behind Blue Eyes". A video of this was uploaded to the band's official YouTube channel on 28 October 2021.

On 18 December 2021 the band announced a new single called "Bad Love" via Instagram. It was originally to be released on 21 January 2022; however the band posted a message on 18 January 2022 via their Discord server announcing their record label Sony Music Germany decided to postpone the release due to Bill and Tom Kaulitz being unable to travel to Germany in time for the promotion of the single. This was eventually released on 4 February 2022 along with its accompanying music video.

On 6 March 2022 the band postponed their Beyond the World Tour until Spring 2023 in the wake of the conflict between Russia and Ukraine. A message written on their official Instagram page reads: "Dear Aliens, we are currently discussing on a daily basis what is appropriate to share and how to carry on with our music. It just doesn't feel right to do business as usual and we won't. At the same time music has always been a place of love, hope and unity and we're trying to find ways to keep sharing this with you. We're sure everybody understands that we can't pursue our upcoming tour as planned but we can announce today that we have successfully moved a majority of the shows to new dates in 2023. More to follow. All tickets remain valid. Sending love to each and everyone of you. George, Gustav, Tom and Bill."

On 16 March 2022 the band announced a new single called "HIM", which was released on 8 April 2022 along with its official music video.

On 28 April 2022 the band uploaded a "spoiler alert" snippet on their official TikTok account showing the vocals for their new single "When We Were Younger", which was released on 27 May 2022. An official snippet of the song was also posted on their official Discord server, and its official lyric video was uploaded onto their official YouTube account.

The band recorded a new single with German indie rock band Kraftklub called "Fahr mit mir (4x4)". This was released on 8 July 2022.

On 19 July 2022 the band announced their seventh album 2001 will be released on 18 November 2022.

On 24 August 2022 the band uploaded a snippet of their new single "Happy People", featuring a guest appearance from Icelandic musician Daði Freyr, to their official YouTube channel. This was released on 21 October 2022.

On 18 November 2022 the band released the new album called 2001.

Other activity
On January 19, 2010, lead singer Bill Kaulitz teamed up with twins Dean and Dan Caten of DSquared to walk the runway at a fashion event in Milan. Kaulitz made two appearances, as he opened and closed DSquared's Menswear Autumn/Winter 2010 show to Tokio Hotel's songs "Scream" and "Screamin'" respectively.

Car maker Audi hired the two frontmen to star in their new advertising campaign to attract the younger generation. They were featured in an episode of Tokio Hotel TV (on Tokio Hotel's website) and also in a commercial.

On August 4, 2010, Tom Kaulitz got his own Reebok shoe commercial. Reebok signed the 20-year-old Tokio Hotel guitarist and sneaker addict to model shoes for the company. "At home, I created a little room like a little storage room," he said of his sneakers. He also said that he gets 10 new pairs a week.

Bill and Tom released an app named "BTK Twins" for Android on December 19, 2011 and iOS on January 16, 2012 to keep in touch with their fans. On the app Bill and Tom post photos, videos and text messages and fans can leave messages which the twins often respond to. In November 2013 the app was removed from both the Android and iOS store due to the imminent release of Tokio Hotel's new album.

Bill and Tom appeared as jury members on the 10th season of Deutschland sucht den Superstar which broadcast from January 5 until May 11, 2013.

Band members
Bill Kaulitz – lead vocals
Tom Kaulitz – guitars, keyboards, piano, backing vocals, percussion
Georg Listing – bass, keyboards, backing vocals
Gustav Schäfer – drums, percussion, backing vocals

Discography

Studio albums
 Schrei (2005)
 Zimmer 483 (2007)
 Scream (2007)
 Humanoid (2009)
 Kings of Suburbia (2014)
 Dream Machine (2017)
 2001 (2022)

Videography
Music videos
 List of Tokio Hotel music videos

Live albums
 Schrei – Live (Universal, 2006)
 Zimmer 483 – Live in Europe (Universal, 2007)
 Humanoid City Live (Cherry Tree, 2010)

Documentaries
 Leb' die Sekunde – Behind the Scenes (2005)
 Tokio Hotel TV – Caught on Camera (2008)
 Tokio Hotel – Hinter Die Welt (2017)

Concert tours

Awards
Since the release of the single "Durch den Monsun" in 2005, Tokio Hotel have gone on to win 110 awards in various categories and countries.

2005

2006

2007

2008

2009

2010

2011

2012

2013

2014

2015

2018

References

Further reading
 Bader, Bianka. Bill ist halt nicht so hundertprozentig dieser Hardcore Typ. Eine empirische Untersuchung zu Männlichkeitsinszenierungen der Pop-Gruppe "Tokio-Hotel" und deren Rezeption durch Fans. Flensburg, Flensburg Univ. Press, 2008. .
 Leipelt-Tsai, Monika. "Tokio Hotel: Articulation of the Subaltern in German Pop Culture?" Ed. Chang, Tai-Lin. New Trends in Contemporary European Literature, Culture and Language, Institute of Foreign Languages, Taipei. 2011, 245-280. .
 Leipelt-Tsai, Monika. "Tokio Hotel. Translating German Pop Culture" . Guang Yi. Lingual, Literary, and Cultural Translation. Translation Center, College of Foreign Languages and Literatures, National Chengchi University, No. 3, Taipei, January 2010, 101–128. .

External links

 

 
2001 establishments in Germany
Musical groups established in 2001
East German musical groups
German pop rock music groups
German alternative rock groups
German glam rock musical groups
German electronic rock musical groups
German synthpop groups
Emo musical groups
English-language singers from Germany
Sibling musical groups
MTV Europe Music Award winners